Conemaugh Township is a township in Indiana County, Pennsylvania, United States. The population was 2,080 at the 2020 census. The township includes the communities of Clarksburg, Foster, Lewisville, McKeeverville, Nowrytown, Tunnelton (formerly called Kelly Station), and White.

Geography

Streams
The township is bordered on the south by the Conemaugh and Kiskiminetas Rivers. Blacklegs Creek flows through the township before joining the Kiskiminetas River near Saltsburg.

Demographics

As of the census of 2000, there were 2,437 people, 958 households, and 711 families residing in the township.  The population density was 72.1 people per square mile (27.8/km2).  There were 1,023 housing units at an average density of 30.3/sq mi (11.7/km2).  The racial makeup of the township was 99.18% White, 0.04% African American, 0.04% Native American, 0.12% Asian, 0.04% from other races, and 0.57% from two or more races. Hispanic or Latino of any race were 0.08% of the population.

There were 958 households, out of which 30.6% had children under the age of 18 living with them, 63.2% were married couples living together, 7.4% had a female householder with no husband present, and 25.7% were non-families. 22.2% of all households were made up of individuals, and 11.6% had someone living alone who was 65 years of age or older.  The average household size was 2.54 and the average family size was 2.97.

In the township the population was spread out, with 24.0% under the age of 18, 5.3% from 18 to 24, 29.9% from 25 to 44, 23.9% from 45 to 64, and 16.9% who were 65 years of age or older.  The median age was 40 years. For every 100 females, there were 100.7 males.  For every 100 females age 18 and over, there were 98.0 males.

The median income for a household in the township was $31,184, and the median income for a family was $35,386. Males had a median income of $29,839 versus $20,425 for females. The per capita income for the township was $14,378.  About 8.6% of families and 13.0% of the population were below the poverty line, including 16.1% of those under age 18 and 4.7% of those age 65 or over.

References

Townships in Indiana County, Pennsylvania
Townships in Pennsylvania